A-kinase anchor protein 6 is an enzyme that in humans is encoded by the AKAP6 gene.

The A-kinase anchor proteins (AKAPs) are a group of structurally diverse proteins, which have the common function of binding to the regulatory subunit of protein kinase A (PKA) and confining the holoenzyme to discrete locations within the cell. This gene encodes a member of the AKAP family. The encoded protein is highly expressed in various brain regions and cardiac and skeletal muscle. It is specifically localized to the sarcoplasmic reticulum and nuclear membrane, and is involved in anchoring PKA to the nuclear membrane or sarcoplasmic reticulum.

Interactions
AKAP6 has been shown to interact with Ryanodine receptor 2 and PDE4D3.

References

External links

Further reading

A-kinase-anchoring proteins